An immigration consultant is a person who helps people to emigrate from one country to another country and through legal and documentation process to increase the chances of immigration for study, work, travel or business purpose. 

Immigration consultants may or may not have legal expertise about immigration laws and visa laws and about procedures for obtaining different types of visas, as the designation is regulated by some, but not all, governments. In the United States, immigration consultants/notaries are not required to have formal immigration law training and are not allowed to answer even the most basic immigration legal questions. Doing so would constitute unauthorized practice of law, which is a crime. Because of this, many organizations including the Central America Resource Center recommend that all persons seeking immigration assistance completely avoid notaries and immigration consultants and, instead, seek legal advice from a licensed attorney. On the other hand, Canada provides certification as a Regulated Canadian Immigration Consultant through the Immigration Consultants of Canada Regulatory Council, and Australia provides it through the Migration Agents Registration Authority.

Immigration consultants started working in the 1960s when a large number of qualified people have started migrating from Asia and Latin America to the United States, Canada and Europe. Generally these developed countries have requirement of highly skilled professionals and so they have very strict and complicated rules for immigration and visa processing. To help aid people who need clarity regarding the visa and immigration rules of various countries, this concept of immigration consultancies has come forward.

References

3. "Canada Visa and Immigration Solutions by Gursach Immigration Solutions. 

4. Student Visa Consultancy Service by Gursach Immigration Solutions
Immigration